Winter rest (from the German term Winterruhe) is a state of reduced activity of plants and warm-blooded animals living in extratropical regions of the world during the more hostile environmental conditions of winter. In this state, they save energy during cold weather while they have limited access to food sources.

Plants
Deciduous trees lose their foliage in the winter. Tree growth rings are a result of winter rest, as there is rapid growth in the warmer spring, then slower growth later in the year.

Perennial and biennial herbaceous plants lose their frost-sensitive, above-ground parts before the winter, and regrow in the spring. Herbaceous plants that are annual, producing seeds before the winter, can also be considered to have winter rest in some form, because their seeds may stay inactive over the winter before germinating. Annual plants which have seeds that germinate before winter also have winter rest. Winter cereals, for example, which are sown in the fall and germinate before the frost, become dormant during the winter and actually require a few weeks of cold before they are able to flower.

Animals
Winter rest in an animal is different from true hibernation, since their metabolism is not reduced drastically. Body temperature is not significantly lowered, however their heart rate is reduced. This means that animals like the raccoon can quickly become active again if temperatures rise or the snow melts. Other animals that winter rest are badgers.

See also
 Growing season
 Cereal germ — the part of the cereal seed that grows into a plant
 Seed dormancy
 Stratification — the simulation of natural winter conditions for seeds
 Thermoregulation — The ability for an organism to keep its temperature within a certain range

References 

Animal physiology
Winter phenomena
Plant physiology